Collected Poems is a book of Paul Goodman's collected poetry, edited by his literary executor Taylor Stoehr and introduced by George Dennison.

Ned Rorem, who had set Goodman's poetry to art song, felt that Goodman's revisions had weakened his originals.

References

Further reading 

 
 
 
 
 
 
 
 
 
 
 
 
 
 
 
 

1974 poetry books
American poetry collections
English-language books
Vintage Books books